Ahl al-Bayt refers to the family tree of Muhammad, but the term has also been extended in Sunnī Islam to apply to all descendants of the Banu Hashim (Muhammad's clan) and even to all Muslims. In Shīʿa Islam, the term is limited to Muhammad; his daughter Fāṭimah, his cousin and son-in-law Alī ibn Abī Ṭālib, and their two sons, Ḥasan and Ḥusayn. A common Sunni view adds the wives of Muhammad to those five.

While all Muslims revere the Ahl al-Bayt, it is the Shīʿa Muslims who hold the Ahl al-Bayt in the highest esteem by regarding them as the rightful leaders of the entire Muslim community. The Twelver Shīʿas also believe in the redemptive power of the pain and martyrdom endured by the members of Ahl al-Bayt, particularly by Ḥusayn ibn ʿAlī.

Definition 
When  appears in construction with a person, it refers to his blood relatives but the word also acquires wider meanings with other nouns. That is,  is literally translated to '(the) people of the house' and to 'household' in the absence of the definite article .

Other prophets 
The phrase  appears three times in the Quran and in relation to Abraham (11:73), Moses (28:12), and Muhammad (33:33). For Abraham and Moses, their  in the Quran is unanimously understood by commentators as referring to their family. Merit is also a criterion of membership in a prophet's  in the Quran. That is, pagan or disloyal members of the families of the past prophets are not excluded from God's punishment. In particular, Noah's family is saved from the deluge, except his wife and one of his sons, about whom Noah's plea was rejected according to verse 11:46, "O Noah, he [your son] is not of your family." 

According to Madelung, families of the past prophets are given a prominent role in the Quran. In particular, after the past prophets, their kin are selected by God as the spiritual and material heirs to the prophets. Jafri is of the same opinion.

Account 

The last passage of the Verse of Purification reads:

Inclusion of the Ahl al-Kisa 
The majority of the traditions quoted by al-Tabari in his exegesis identify the Ahl al-Bayt with the Ahl al-Kisa, namely, Muhammad, Ali, Fatima, Hasan, and Husayn. These traditions are also cited by some other early Sunni authorities, including Ahmad ibn Hanbal, al-Suyuti, al-Hafiz al-Kabir, and Ibn Kathir. Similarly, the canonical Sunni collection Sunnan al-Tirmidhi holds that Muhammad limited the Ahl al-Bayt to Ali, Fatima, and their two sons when the Verse of Purification was revealed to him.

Muhammad's wife Umm Salama relates in (possibly the earliest version of) the Hadith al-Kisa that Muhammad gathered Ali, Fatima, Hasan, and Husayn under his cloak and prayed, "O God, these are my  and my closest family members; remove defilement from them and purify them completely." The accounts of the Sunni Ibn Kathir and al-Suyuti and the Shia Tabatabai continue that Umm Salama asked Muhammad, "Am I with thee, O Messenger of God?" but received the negative response, "Thou shalt obtain good. Thou shalt obtain good." There also exists a version of this hadith in Sunni sources where Umm Salama is included in the Ahl al-Bayt. In another Sunni version, Muhammad's servant Wathila bint al-Asqa' is included in the Ahl al-Bayt.

Muhammad is said to have recited the last passage of the Verse of Purification every morning when he passed by Fatima's house to remind her household of the  prayer. In the Event of Mubahala, Muhammad is believed to have gathered Ali, Fatima, and their sons under his cloak and referred to them as the Ahl al-Bayt, according to Shia and some Sunni sources, including the canonical Sahih Muslim and Sunan al-Tirmidhi.

This makeup of the Ahl al-Bayt is echoed by Veccia Vaglieri and unanimously reported in Shia sources. In Shia theology works, the Ahl al-Bayt often also includes the remaining Shia Imams. The term is sometimes loosely applied in Shia writings to all descendants of Ali and Fatima. The Verse of Purification is regarded by the Shia as evidence of the infallibility of the Ahl al-Bayt.

Inclusion of Muhammad's wives 
Possibly because the earlier injunctions in the Verse of Purification are addressed at Muhammad's wives, some Sunni authors (such as al-Wahidi) have exclusively interpreted Ahl al-Bayt as Muhammad's wives. Others have noted that the last passage of this verse is grammatically inconsistent with the previous injunctions (masculine plural versus feminine plural pronouns). Thus the Ahl al-Bayt is not or is not limited to Muhammad's wives. Ibn Kathir, for instance, also includes Ali, Fatima, and their two sons.

Some Sunni hadiths, including some narrated by Ibn Abbas and Ikrima, support the inclusion of Muhammad's wives in the Ahl al-Bayt. Alternatively, Leaman holds that marriage to a prophet does not guarantee inclusion in his . He argues that, in verse 11:73,  Sara is included in Abraham's  only after receiving the news of her imminent motherhood to two prophets, Isaac and Jacob.

In support of their bid for inclusion in the Ahl al-Bayt, the Abbasids argued that women, noble and holy as they may be, could not be considered a source of pedigree. They also claimed that Muhammad's paternal uncle Abbas was equal to the father after the death of Muhammad's father.

Broader interpretations 
As hinted above, some Sunni authors have broadened the application of the term to include in the Ahl al-Bayt the clan of Muhammad (Banu Hashim), the Banu Muttalib, the descendants of Muhammad's uncle Abbas (Abbasids), and even the descendants of Hashim's nephew Umayya (Umayyads). In particular, there exists an Abbasid version of the Hadith al-Kisa in Sunni sources that might have been intended to strengthen the Abbasid claims to inclusion among the Ahl al-Bayt. This assertion was in turn the cornerstone of Abbasid claims to the caliphate. Similarly, a Sunni version of the Hadith al-Thaqalayn identifies the Ahl al-Bayt with the descendants of Ali and his brothers (Aqil and Jafar), and Muhammad's uncle, Abbas.

Abu Bakr and Umar have also been included by some in the Ahl al-Bayt by their supporters as they were both fathers-in-law of Muhammad. These and the accounts about the inclusion of the Umayyads in the Ahl al-Bayt might have been later reactions to Abbasid claims to inclusion in the Ahl al-Bayt and their bid for legitimacy, according to Brunner. The term has also been interpreted as the tribe of Quraysh, or the whole Muslim community by some. For instance, Paret identified  in the Verse of Purification with Kaaba, though his theory has found few supporters, notably Sharon.

Conclusion 
Howard concludes that a typical Sunni compromise is to interpret Ahl al-Bayt as the Ahl al-Kisa (Muhammad, Ali, Fatima, Hasan, Husayn) together with Muhammad's wives, which might reflect the majority opinion of medieval Sunni exegetes. This view is included in Sharon's survey of different opinions and shared by Goldziher and his coauthors, though Madelung also includes the Banu Hashim in the Ahl al-Bayt because of their blood relation to Muhammad.

In contrast, Shia Islam limits the Ahl al-Bayt to Muhammad, Ali, Fatima, Hasan, and Husayn, pointing to authentic traditions that can be found in Sunni and Shia sources. Their view is supported by Veccia Vaglieri and Jafri.

Place in Islam

In the Quran 
Muslims venerate Muhammad's household. In particular, blessings on the family of Muhammad are invoked in every prayer. In the Quran, families and descendants of the past prophets hold a prominent position. In particular, after the past prophets, their descendants become spiritual and material heirs to keep their fathers' covenants intact. Jafri suggests that the sanctity of a prophet's family was an accepted principle at the time of Muhammad, while Madelung believes that Muhammad's kin are mentioned in the Quran in various contexts.

Verse of Mawadda 
Verse 42:23 of the Quran, also known as the Verse of Mawadda, includes the passageThe word kinsfolk in this verse is interpreted by the Shia as the Ahl al-Bayt. Ibn Ishaq narrates that the prophet specified  as his daughter Fatima, her husband Ali, and their two sons, Hasan and Husayn. As quoted by Madelung, Hasan ibn Ali referred to the Verse of Mawadda in his inaugural speech as the caliph after the assassination of his father in 661, saying that he belonged to the Ahl al-Bayt "whose love He [God] has made obligatory in His Book [Quran]..."

The Verse of Mawadda is often cited by the Shia about the elevated status of the Ahl al-Bayt. In Twelver Shia, the affection in this verse also entails obedience to the Ahl al-Bayt as the source of exoteric and esoteric guidance. This obedience is believed to benefit the faithful first and foremost, citing the following passage of verse 34:47, which contains the passage, "Say, 'I ask not of you any reward; that shall be yours.'"

Some Sunni commentators agree with the Shia view, including Baydawi, al-Razi, and Ibn Maghazili. Most Sunni authors, however, reject the Shia view and offer various alternatives. The view preferred by al-Tabari is that the Verse of Mawadda instructs Muslims to love the prophet because of their blood relations to him. Alternatively, Madelung suggests that the Verse of Mawadda demands love towards relatives in general.

Verse of Mubahala 
Another example is verse 3:61 of the Quran. This is when Muhammad is reported to have received verse 3:61 of the Quran, also known as the Verse of Mubahala, which reads

Madelung argues that 'our sons' in the Verse of Mubahala must refer to Muhammad's grandchildren, Hasan and Husayn. In that case, he continues, it would be reasonable to also include in the event their parents, Ali and Fatima. Madelung writes that their inclusion by Muhammad in this significant ritual must have raised the religious rank of his family. A similar view is voiced by Lalani. 

Of those present on Muhammad's side, Shia traditions are unanimous that 'our women' refers to Fatima and 'ourselves' refers to Ali. In particular, since the verse refers to Ali as the self of Muhammad, Shia holds that the former enjoys the same authority as the prophet. In contrast, most Sunni accounts by al-Tabari do not name the participants of the event, while some other Sunni historians agree with the Shia view, including al-Razi and al-Suyuti.

Some accounts about the Event of Mubahala add that Muhammad, Ali, Fatima, Hasan, and Husayn stood under Muhammad's cloak and this five are thus known as the Ahl al-Kisa. At the Mubahala, Muhammad is reported to have defined the Ahl al-Bayt as Ali, Fatima, and their two sons, according to Shia and some Sunni sources, including the canonical Sahih Muslim and Sunan al-Tirmidhi.

Khums 
The latter comprises lands and properties conquered peacefully by Muslims. Because alms-giving is considered an act of purification in Islam, this Quranic directive is seen as a compensation for the exclusion of Muhammad and his family from alms, given their state of purity in the Quran.

In the hadith literature 
Muhammad is said to have repeatedly emphasized the significance of the Ahl al-Bayt. An instance is the Hadith al-Thaqalayn, which is widely reported by Sunni and Shia authorities. In particular, the version of the Hadith al-Thaqalayn that appears in Musnad Ibn Hanbal, a canonical Sunni source, is as follows:

There are several slightly different versions of this hadith in Sunni sources, suggesting that Muhammad might have repeated this statement on multiple occasions. In particular, the version that appears in as-Sunan al-kubra, another canonical Sunni source, also includes the warning, "Be careful how you treat the two [treasures] after me."

Another instance is the Hadith of the Ark, attributed to Muhammad and reported by Shia and Sunni sources in various forms, according to Momen. One version of the Hadith of the Ark reads, "The likeness of the people of my house is the ship of Noah: whoever boards it is safe, and whoever abandons it is drowned." Also ascribed to Muhammad is the hadith, "By Him in Whose Hand is my soul, faith will never enter a person's heart until he loves them [Muhammad's family] for the sake of God and for the fact that they are my kin."

In Muslim communities 
In many Muslim communities, high social status is given to people claiming descent from Ali and Fatima. They are called s or s. Campo writes that Sunnis revere the Ahl al-Bayt, though Brunner suggests that this was the case until modern times. Most Sufi s (brotherhoods) trace their spiritual chain to Muhammad through Ali and revere the Ahl al-Kisa as the Holy Five. 

It is, however, the (Twelver and Isma'ili) Shia who hold the Ahl al-Bayt in the highest esteem, regarding them as the infallible leaders of the Muslim community. They also believe in the redemptive power of the pain and martyrdom endured by the Ahl al-Bayt (particularly by Husayn) for those who empathize with their divine cause and suffering. The Twelver Shia await the messianic advent of Mahdi who would usher in an era of peace and justice by overcoming tyranny and oppression on earth. Various Shia sources also ascribe cosmological importance to the Ahl al-Bayt, where they are viewed as the reason for the creation. 

According to Campo, several Muslim heads of state and politicians have claimed blood descent from the family of Muhammad, including the Alawid dynasty of Morocco, the Hashimite dynasty of Iraq and of Jordan, and the leader of the Iranian revolution, Khomeini.

See also

References

Citations

Sources

Further reading 
 
 Who Are Ahlul-Bayt?
 Ahl al-Bayt: Its Meaning and Origin

Arabic words and phrases

Islamic terminology
Quranic words and phrases
Middle Eastern royal families
Banu Hashim